The Quest of Alain Ducasse is a 2017 French documentary film written, produced and directed by Gilles de Maistre which follows the "quests" undertaken by renowned chef Alain Ducasse.

Plot
The film follows the travels and events organized by Alain Ducasse, a well-known and successful restaurateur. In doing so, the movie tries to understand and unveil what motivates him in his "quests".

Cast
 Alain Ducasse as himself
 François Hollande as himself
 Emmanuel Macron as himself
 Prince Albert of Monaco as himself
 Massimo Bottura as himself
 Laurent Fabius as himself
 Jacques Toubon as himself
 Donald Trump as himself

Release

Reception
The review aggregator website Rotten Tomatoes reported a 69% approval rating based on 13 reviews. Glenn Kenny from The New York Times gave the film a bad review, stating: "I found 'The Quest of Alain Ducasse', a near-hagiographic documentary on the celebrated chef, a less than satisfactory experience." Serena Donadoni writing for the Village Voice, said: "De Maistre makes the case that haute cuisine serves the same function as haute couture, creating an indelible experience while encouraging new ideas to filter through the industry." Jordan Mintzer in his review for The Hollywood Reporter wrote: "If Ducasse is somewhat renowned for the simplicity of his dishes, for the way he can blend a few homegrown ingredients to achieve the perfect amalgam, then de Maistre definitely lathers the man with too much sauce." Alissa Simon from Variety called the movie "absorbing and cinematic", stating: "'The Quest of Alain Ducasse' offers the documentary equivalent of a memorable meal at one of the eponymous chef's three Michelin-starred restaurants."

References

External links
 
 

2017 documentary films
2017 films
French documentary films
2010s French films